Beihai ("North Sea") may refer to the following places in the People's Republic of China:

 Beihai, a prefecture-level city in the south of Guangxi Autonomous Region
 Beihai Park, an imperial garden in Beijing
 Lake Baikal, the Beihai of the Four Seas
 Beihaibei station, a station on Line 6 of the Beijing Subway
 Beihai Commandery, a historical commandery in present-day Shandong, China

See also
Hokkaido, literally means Northern Sea Circuit.
North Sea
Nanhai (disambiguation) ("South Sea")
Donghai (disambiguation) ("East Sea")
Xihai (disambiguation) ("West Sea")